Henry Higgins may refer to:

 The fictional character: see Pygmalion (play), or My Fair Lady
 H. B. Higgins (1851–1929), Australian politician and judge
 Henry Higgins (botanist) (1814–1893), English botanist
 Henry Higgins (bullfighter) (1944–1978), English bullfighter
 Henry Higgins (athlete) (1907–?), English athlete

See also
 Harry Higgins (1894–1979), English cricketer
 Henry Huggins, fictional character